J. R. R. Tolkien's Riders of Rohan is a computer video game from 1991 based upon the fictional War of the Ring set in the Middle-earth world created by J. R. R. Tolkien, centered in The Lord of the Rings novels. The massive-scale simulation takes part in the realm of Rohan and the player controls the forces of Good during the onslaught of the forces of Evil, namely centered on the conflict with Saruman of Isengard. It was published by Konami and Mirrorsoft.

Gameplay
In terms of gameplay, it is very similar to the 1988 War in Middle Earth, except the setting was downsized from the entire world just to the land of the Rohirrim, engulfing mostly the storyline from The Two Towers, and to a small extent ending in The Return of the King. In a combination of a single-unit adventure, small-scale battlefield tactics and broadscale campaign warfare, the player must coordinate the Fellowship and Rohan's troops in order to fend off the invasion of Saruman's Orcs and save the Rohirrim lands, as well as mounting enough forces to push the war on the fronts in the east in order to contribute to Sauron's defeat.

At the beginning, the player can in the starting menu choose to start a new game, load an old one, quit, access encyclopedias dealing with featured units and characters, or practice. The practice folds down to tutorials in single-fighter combat:
- Archery: the player takes control of Legolas attempting to shoot down (18) Orcs from a wall, while crouching from their spears
- Duel: the player chooses between four Heroes: Aragorn, Legolas, Gimli and Éomer, to fight either an Orc or a Dunlending in melee combat
- Magic Duel: the player takes control over Gandalf fighting a Nazgûl flying mounted on a Felbeast

The game begins just before the Battles at the Fords of Isen, with the player taking control over Rohan's western armies (an army consisted of an infantry unit [Westfold Militia], a light cavalry unit [Outriders], a horse archers unit [Harrowdale Bow] and three heave cavalry units [Helms Deep Guards and Edoras Guards, the Grimslade squadron being under Théodred's personal leadership]). The main army is led by Théodred, while there is a separate unit of heavy cavalry [Harrowdale] that is still behind on the road. The game ends when Sauron is destroyed after the Battle at the Black Gates and Frodo and Sam reach Mount Doom.

Units
The player can control only the good side in the conflict.
 Rohirrim Infantry - the poor, the young and the old gathered together, versatile all-round melee fighters eager to patriotically defend their homeland (squad size: 600)
 Rohirrim Archers - Rohan ground units which have mastered the proficiency with the bow (squad size: 150)
 Rohirrim Light Cavalry - fastest in the world, ideal scouts; useful for rapid skirmishes (squad size: 450)
 Rohirrim Heavy Cavalry - renown horsemen, among the hardest fighters in the world; useful for routing enemies with their lances (squad size: 450)
 Rohirrim Horse Archers - highly skilled, mounted ranged units; can also fire while moving but with reduced accuracy (squad size: 150)
 Ents - tree-like beings from Fangorn forest as they are, they are fiercely powerful warriors little can stand against, should they ever decide to join the conflict and not neutrally stand by idle.
 Orcs - all-around melee units, but generally weak and flee when outnumbered; vulnerable when exposed to direct sunlight
 Orcish archers - coward Orc fighters that have mastered the proficiency with the bow
 Uruk-hai - elite Saruman's warriors, hybrid orcs; travel across sunlight without problem; fierce fighters that can stand ground against most
 War Riders - Orcs mounted on the backs of large wolves (Wargs); very savage and fierce, except when their attack is broken; their mounts are hungry and independent on their own, very weakly trained
 Dunlendings - savage, lightly-armed tribesmen from the countryside with an innate hatred for the Rohirrim, will blindly fight to the death

Characters 
The game features a number of characters, only conditionally "heroes": 
 Aragorn - (Fellowship) the mightiest mortal in the world, a brilliant personal fighter; master strategic leader
 Gimli - (Fellowship) masterful hand-to-hand combat fighter
 Legolas (Fellowship) - Elven prince; best archer in the world, very quick but lightly armed
 Gandalf (Fellowship) - a Wizard (Maia) sent by the Valar to aid the Free Peoples against the Dark Lord, the most powerful hero; avoids combat and councils others, best fighter amongst the Good forces with unmatched powers, invincible through conventional means (can wipe out nearly anything)
 Merry (Fellowship) - non-combatant; stealthy
 Pippin (Fellowship) - non-combatant; stealthy
 Treebeard (Ents) - leader of the Ents, among the oldest creatures; concerned for the living, especially his native Forest
 Éomer (Rohan) - King's nephew and Third Marshall of the Riddermark; excellent leader as second only to the King; very good sword fighter
 Erkenbrand (Rohan) - Leader of Westfold and commander of Helm's Deep; an exceptional warrior and is bent on maintaining the defenses at the Hornburg
 Hama (Rohan) - King's Doorward and Captain of His Guard; a very good fighter as boundlessly loyal
 Théoden (Rohan) - The King. The best military commander in the world, still a potent fighter, but very old and physically weakened
 Théodred (Rohan) - Prince, Second Marshal of the Riddermark. Identical to Éomer (personal combat), but a weaker commander
 Éowyn (Rohan) - 'Eomer's sister, inspires the people as a shield maiden; non-combatant
 Gríma (Rohan/Isengard) - The King's councilor, convinced Saruman is an ally, in reality a spy and saboteur
 Saruman (Isengard) - the chief antagonist; powerful as Gandalf, unengaged leader of the evil forces; wants to annihilate the Rohirrim and get the One Ring for himself, building an Army of dark forces for that task

Reception
Computer Gaming World called the game's graphics "simple, yet pleasing", but described it as "a lightweight strategy game that includes several action sequences and some very limited character interaction". The magazine stated that those who had not read Tolkien's books would likely not understand the game's backstory, and that strategy players would dislike how closely they needed to follow the original story's actions to succeed in the game. Computer Gaming World only recommended it to devoted Tolkien fans.

See also 
 War in Middle Earth (1988 computer game)

References

External links
J. R. R. Tolkien's Riders of Rohan at MobyGames

1991 video games
DOS games
DOS-only games
Konami games
Papyrus Design Group games
Personal Software Services games
Single-player video games
Strategy video games
Riders of Rohan
Video games developed in Australia
Video games developed in the United States
Mirrorsoft games